Allerheiligen im Mürztal was a municipality in Austria which merged in January 2015 into Kindberg in the Bruck-Mürzzuschlag District of Styria, Austria. It is not to be confused with the municipality of Allerheiligen bei Wildon in Southern Styria.

Geography

References

Cities and towns in Bruck-Mürzzuschlag District